Julius Schäffer (3 June 1882 – 21 October 1944) was a German mycologist. His contributions include studies on the Agaricales (gilled mushrooms), especially the genus Russula, about which he wrote a monograph in 1933. Later, he revised the genus in the series Die Pilze Mitteleuropas (1926–1967); his notes were published posthumously by his wife Liesel in 1952 with the help of other mycologists. The work was considered the "authoritative treatment of the group for Central Europe". One of the Russula species that was first described in this publication was R. laeta. Schäffer developed a chemical test to help with the identification of Agaricus species. A positive reaction of Schaeffer's test, which uses the reaction of aniline and nitric acid on the surface of the mushroom, is indicated by an orange to red color; it is characteristic of species in the section Flavescentes. The compounds responsible for the reaction were named schaefferal A and B to honor Schäffer.

Schäffer is the only mycologist of modern times known to have died from consuming poisonous mushrooms, in this case, Paxillus involutus. About an hour after he and his wife ate a meal prepared with the mushrooms, Schäffer developed vomiting, diarrhea, and fever. His condition worsened to the point where he was admitted to hospital the following day, and subsequently developed renal failure, perishing after 17 days.

Eponymous taxa
Several species have been named in honor of Schaeffer:
Agaricus schaefferianus Hlavácek 1987
now Agaricus urinascens (Jul. Schäff. & F.H. Møller) Singer 1951)
Cortinarius schaefferanus (M.M. Moser) M.M. Moser 1967
Cortinarius schaefferi Bres. 1930
Dermocybe schaefferi (Bres.) M.M. Moser 1986
Lentinus schaefferi (Weinm.) Rauschert 1988
now Neolentinus schaefferi (Weinm.) Redhead & Ginns 1985
Phyllosticta schaefferiae Gonz. Frag. & Cif. 1926
Russula nauseosa var. schaefferi Kill. 1939
Russula schaefferi Kärcher 1996
Russula schaefferiana Niolle 1943
Russula schaefferina Rawla & Sarwal 1983

Selected publications
Schäffer, J. (1947). "Beobachtungen an Oberbayerischen Blätterpilzen". Berichte der bayerischen botanischen Gesellschaft 27: 201–225.

References

German mycologists
1882 births
1944 deaths
Deaths from food poisoning
Accidental deaths in Germany